Homalium mathieuanum is a species of plant in the family Salicaceae. It is endemic to New Caledonia.

References

Endemic flora of New Caledonia
mathieuanum
Endangered plants
Taxonomy articles created by Polbot